Attila Lipták is a Hungarian sprint canoer who competed in the mid-1980s. He won a bronze medal in the C-1 10000 m at the 1985 ICF Canoe Sprint World Championships in Mechelen.

References

Hungarian male canoeists
Living people
Year of birth missing (living people)
ICF Canoe Sprint World Championships medalists in Canadian